Cornelia de Rijck (11 October 1653 – 4 October 1726) was a Dutch painter specialized in painting birds and insects.

She was born in Amsterdam as the daughter of Dirck Jansz. de Rijck and Ariaantje Wessels. She married Gerrit van Goor in 1688, followed by a second marriage to Simon Schijnvoet in 1697. Her first husband was a portrait painter who painted her portrait, and together they taught the artist Gerrit Rademaker who continued to follow lessons from her as a widow.

She is known for her meticulous studies of insects, 116 of which are in a portfolio in the Stockholm archives. Her paintings have been compared to that of Melchior d'Hondecoeter. 
She died in Amsterdam.

Gallery

References

1653 births
1726 deaths
Painters from Amsterdam
18th-century Dutch painters
17th-century Dutch painters
Dutch women painters
17th-century women artists
18th-century Dutch women artists